Reefer Madness: The Movie Musical, also known as Reefer Madness, is a 2005 American made-for-television musical comedy film directed by Andy Fickman, written by Kevin Murphy and Dan Studney, and produced by the three. It is a film adaptation of the trio's 1998 musical of the same name, itself based on the 1936 exploitation film also of the same title. It premiered on Showtime on April 16, 2005. The film also received a limited theatrical release overseas, and grossed $8,972 in its short run.

The film stars Kristen Bell, Christian Campbell, and John Kassir reprising their stage roles, with the notable addition of Alan Cumming and Ana Gasteyer in other lead roles. Robert Torti, who played the characters of both Jack and Jesus onstage, portrays only the latter in this version.

Plot
In a small middle-America town in 1936, a group of parents have been gathered by a mysterious Lecturer for an assembly. The ominous Lecturer informs the parents that he has come to warn them about the evils of marijuana on their youth ("Reefer Madness") through the tragic tale of one boy's struggles with the demon weed in a film titled "Tell Your Children". Throughout the film, the Lecturer stops to detail a political point or to condescend any audience member questioning his credibility.

Jimmy Harper and Mary Lane, a joyful teen couple, blissfully enjoy each other's company ("Romeo & Juliet"), unaware of the seedy goings-on in The Reefer Den across town. This is the residence of Mae, who is abused by her boyfriend, Jack, a street tough who supplies her and others with dope ("The Stuff"). Mary, Jimmy and their school friends head to Miss Poppy's Five and Dime, ("Down at the Ol' Five and Dime"). Jack appears at the hangout, offering Jimmy swing lessons to impress Mary.

Jimmy is taken to the Reefer Den, where Jack, Mae, college dropout Ralph and neighborhood prostitute Sally pressure him into smoking his first joint, leading him to a hallucination of an insidious bacchanal. ("Jimmy Takes a Hit/ The Orgy"). Jimmy turns into a crazed addict and neglects Mary, leading her to pray for him ("Lonely Pew"). While breaking into a church to steal collection money, Jimmy has a vision of Jesus Christ in a Vegas-esque Heaven, telling him to change his ways or be sent to eternal damnation ("Listen to Jesus, Jimmy"). Jimmy refuses to heed the word of God and continues to spiral into sin.

One night, Jimmy and Sally take a joy ride in Mary's stolen car while buzzed, running over an old man. Jimmy runs to Mary, debating whether to continue being under the influence or repent his ways ("Mary Jane/ Mary Lane"). Jimmy returns to Mary romantically, but he realizes that he is putting her in danger and tells her that he must leave town without her. Jack brings him back to the Reefer Den with a pot-brownie, putting him in a cartoonized trip ("The Brownie Song"). Mary follows Jimmy to the Den where Ralph seduces her by convincing her that Jimmy has joined his "fraternity". He suggests that they celebrate with a smoke, which turns out to be a toke. This intro to reefer immediately turns Mary into a sadistic dominatrix who terrorizes Ralph for pleasure ("Little Mary Sunshine). Jimmy enters and a fight ensues. Jack stops the fight, knocks out Jimmy and accidentally shoots Mary. He frames an unconscious Jimmy for the crime. Jimmy gives Mary his class ring, and comforts her as she dies in his arms ("Mary's Death").

Jimmy is taken away by police. Racked with guilt, Ralph has pot-induced hallucinations of Jimmy as a ghost, Mary as Satan's sodomy pal and the children who got hooked on the Reefer Gang's dope as the living dead. Ralph gets an extreme case of the munchies and ends up killing and cannibalizing Sally. Jack shoots Ralph to stop him ("Murder!"). Seeing similar visions, Mae realizes the error of her ways and tells Jack to do the same. He rejects her pleas and she bludgeons him to death with a garden hoe, gaining her much-needed empowerment ("The Stuff (Reprise)").

Mae pleads to the visiting President about Jimmy's case, earning the boy a presidential pardon. Jimmy, Mae, the President and Jimmy's fellow prisoners, Ralph, Jack, and Sally (reincarnated as Uncle Sam, George Washington, and Lady Liberty respectively) raise the American justice system and patriotism ("Tell 'Em the Truth"). Jimmy burns down the Reefer Den's weed garden, freeing Mary from both Hell and Satan before everyone's eyes. The Lecturer's film ends with Mary entering Heaven, greeted by Jesus and other Holy souls.

The entire audience joins the suddenly real film cast to hold a huge anti-reefer book burning pledging to join the fight against marijuana, sex, racial and ethnic minorities and other things harmful to their dear country ("Finale"). The Lecturer drives off, pleased that he has succeeded in exploiting everyone's biases.

Cast

Principal cast
 Alan Cumming as The Lecturer, The Goat Man, Franklin Delano Roosevelt, and other minor characters
 Christian Campbell as James Fenimore "Jimmy" Harper
 Kristen Bell as Mary Lane
 Steven Weber as Jack Stone and George Washington in "Tell 'Em the Truth"
 Ana Gasteyer as Mae Coleman
 John Kassir as Ralph Wiley and Uncle Sam in "Tell 'Em the Truth"
 Amy Spanger as Sally DeBanis and Statue of Liberty in "Tell 'Em the Truth"
 Robert Torti as Jesus
 Neve Campbell as Miss Poppy

Supporting cast
 Abraham Jedidiah as Dead Old Man
 Christine Lakin as Joan of Arc
 John Mann as Satan
 Harry S. Murphy as Warden Harrah
 Tom Arntzen as Officer D.J. Sordelet
 Ken Kirzinger as Secret Service Agent Matthews
 Chang Tseng as Asian Man
 Britt Irvin, Alexz Johnson as Arc-ettes

Lecture assembly
 Kevin McNulty as Mayor Harris Macdonald
 Stephen Sisk as Blumsack, the Lecturer's projectionist assistant
 Robert Clarke as Principal Poindexter Short
 Lynda Boyd as Mrs. Deidre Greevey
 Ruth Nichol as Mrs. Roxanne MacDonald
 Michael Goorjian as Mickey Druther

Musical numbers

 Reefer Madness- Lecturer, Parents/ Zombies Ensemble Romeo and Juliet- Jimmy, Mary The Stuff- Mae Down at the Ol' Five and Dime- Mary, Miss Poppy, Lecturer, Youth Ensemble Jimmy Takes a Hit/ The Orgy- Sally, Jimmy, Jack, Mae, Ralph, Exotic Ensemble Lonely Pew - Mary, Lecturer (Organist), Ensemble Listen to Jesus, Jimmy- Jesus Christ, Joan of Arc and Arc-ettes, Satan, Heaven Ensemble Mary Jane/Mary Lane- Jimmy, Mary, Full Company (Mae, Jack, Singing Clams, Miss Poppy, Dead Old Man, Officer Sordelet, Jesus, Joan, Satan, Ralph, Sally, Asian Man) The Brownie Song- (animated) Jimmy, Mae, Sally, Jack, Ralph Little Mary Sunshine- Ralph, Mary Mary's Death- Jimmy, Mary Murder!- Jimmy, Ralph, Mary, Satan, Sally, Jack, Mae, Zombies Ensemble The Stuff (Reprise)- Mae Tell 'Em the Truth (Finale)- Mae, Jimmy, Lecturer (FDR), Mary, Jack, Sally, Ralph, Prisoner Ensemble Romeo and Juliet (Reprise) (Finale)- Mary, Jimmy Reefer Madness (Finale)- Company Reefer Madness (End Credits)- Full Cast Mary Lane (Mary Jane/ Mary Lane)(End Credits)- Mary, Jimmy, Company

Production
In 1998, writing partners Kevin Murphy and Dan Studney, who had met while studying at Drew University in Madison, New Jersey, were driving from Oakland to Los Angeles and listening to Frank Zappa's Joe's Garage, when they began discussing how one might stage the piece. "So I started picturing it in my head," Studney recalls. "Frank Zappa's concept of a musical and then it just hit me. I turned to Kevin and said 'What about doing Reefer Madness as a musical?'" By the time duo reached L.A., they had already written the first song.

The high school is named after Harry J. Anslinger, the first Commissioner of the U.S. Bureau of Narcotics, known as the Father of the Drug War.

ReleaseReefer Madness premiered at the 2005 Sundance Film Festival. It also screened in competition at the 2005 Deauville Film Festival and won the Premiere Audience Award. On April 20, four days following the film's television premiere, Showtime aired the musical back-to-back with the 1936 exploitation film that inspired it.

A limited theatrical release occurred internationally in the Czech Republic and Slovakia. The film made $8,972 in its short run.

Home media
Showtime released the DVD on November 9, 2005. The DVD includes the original film and an audio commentary by director Fickman with several cast members. The DVD case itself also smelled of brownies.

Accolades
The film won the 2005 Emmy Award for Music and Lyrics (for "Mary Jane/Mary Lane", which was written specially for the film). It also received Emmy nominations for Choreography and Make-Up Effects.

Soundtrack
A soundtrack CD was first released by Showtime in their "stash box" press package.  Mixed from the 5.1 audio masters, this version has several anomalies including a few sound effects.

On October 28, 2008, Ghostlight Records released a double CD of the soundtrack from the film and original Los Angeles cast recording. The night before, The Public Theater's Joe's Pub hosted a release party concert featuring a four-person ensemble and leads Alan Cumming, Ana Gasteyer, Christian Campbell, John Kassir, Robert Torti, Amy Spanger, and Jenna Leigh Green doing an abbreviated concert version with introductions to each song by Kevin Murphy.

The two versions of the soundtrack differ in quite a few places, both from each other and from the film, but it is most noticeable during the song Murder''. The Showtime CD features a longer version of the song, sans all spoken dialogue. The Ghostlight CD features a truncated version of the track littered with dialogue from the film.

References

External links
 
 

2005 films
2005 television films
2000s musical comedy films
American comedy television films
American musical comedy films
Canadian comedy television films
Canadian musical comedy films
Films about cannibalism
German television films
German musical comedy films
English-language Canadian films
English-language German films
Films directed by Andy Fickman
Films scored by Nathan Wang
Films based on musicals based on films
Musical film remakes
Portrayals of Jesus in film
Showtime (TV network) original programming
Cultural depictions of Franklin D. Roosevelt
Stoner films
Films based on musicals
2005 comedy films
2000s American films
2000s Canadian films
2000s German films